Herbert James Craig CBE (30 September 1869 – 18 March 1934) was a British Liberal Party politician, businessman and barrister.

Background
He was born the son of James Craig MP and Kate Sophia Hould. He was educated at Rugby School and Trinity College, Cambridge. He married, in 1909, Elsie Rundall.

Career
Craig was called to the bar in 1892 at the Inner Temple, and practised on the North-Eastern Circuit. He served as a Justice of the Peace in Northumberland.

He served as Liberal MP for Tynemouth from 1906 to 1918. He was elected for the first time at 1906 general election, standing for the first time and  gaining the seat from the Conservatives. He was re-elected at both the January 1910 December 1910 general elections.

He served in the Royal Naval Voluntary Reserve (Tyneside division), reaching the rank of Commander during World War I.

At the 1918 general election, when Liberal MPs were forced to choose between support for Lloyd George's government or Asquith's opposition, he was absent from the Maurice debate division. He then sought government endorsement for his candidature but the 'coupon' was issued to his Unionist opponent, and he lost his seat at the 1918.

He stood again at the 1922 general election, trying to regain his seat. However, he was unsuccessful and did not stand for parliament again.

He was head of the firm, Borries, Craig & Co., Ltd, export merchants and shipbrokers, of Newcastle upon Tyne. He was a Commander in the Royal Naval Volunteers and commanded the Tyne Division from 1920 to 1929. He was an Aide-de-camp from 1926 to 1929. He was appointed a CBE in 1929.

Election results

Sources
Who Was Who
British parliamentary election results 1885–1918, Craig, F. W. S.

References

External links 
 
Who Was Who; http://www.ukwhoswho.com

1869 births
1934 deaths
Liberal Party (UK) MPs for English constituencies
UK MPs 1906–1910
UK MPs 1910
UK MPs 1910–1918
Commanders of the Order of the British Empire
People educated at Rugby School
Alumni of Trinity College, Cambridge
Members of the Inner Temple
British businesspeople in shipping
Royal Navy officers of World War I
Royal Naval Volunteer Reserve personnel of World War I